Steel Arena may refer to:

 Steel Aréna, the home arena of the ice hockey club HC Košice
 Steel Arena (film), a 1973 film